Equal Employment Opportunity Commission v. United Health Programs of America is a case in the United States District Court for the Eastern District of New York which ruled an employer's imposition of an "Onionhead" or "Harnessing Happiness" system of beliefs on employees constituted a religions imposition in violation of Title VII of the Civil Rights Act of 1964.

References

Equal Employment Opportunity Commission